The Brûleurs de Loups (French for Wolfs Burners) are a professional ice hockey team that play in Grenoble, France.

History
The club was founded in 1963 under the name Grenoble Hockey Club. Since 1992, the club has been known as the Brûleurs de Loups.

The Brûleurs de Loups hockey team plays in the Ligue Magnus, the highest level in France. They have won the championship eight times (1981, 1982, 1991, 1998, 2007, 2009, 2019, 2022), the French Cup five times (1994, 2008, 2009, 2017, 2023) and the League Cup four times (2007, 2009, 2011, 2015).

Former Montreal Canadiens and Chicago Blackhawks goaltender Cristobal Huet played for Grenoble from the beginning of his career until 1998.
Columbus Blue Jackets forward Alexandre Texier was formed and started his career in Grenoble too.
They were both born in nearby Saint-Martin-d'Hères.

In Februar 2023, The Brûleurs de Loups secured their first place in the Magnus League and won the Jacques Lacarrière Trophy.

Roster 
Updated October 27, 2021.

Notable former players

 Philippe Bozon
 Cristobal Huet
 Robert Ouellet
 Jean-Philippe Lemoine
 Christian Pouget
 Eddy Ferhi
 Alexandre Texier

 Larry Huras
 Réjean Cloutier
 Sylvain Locas
 Éric Chouinard
 Alexandre Giroux

 Vadim Bekbulatov

 Bohuslav Ebermann

Trophies and awards

 Ligue Magnus (French Championship):
  (x8)   1981, 1982, 1991, 1998, 2007, 2009, 2019, 2022
  (x8)  1967, 1968, 1977, 1983, 1990, 2004, 2012, 2018

 French Cup: 
  (x5) 1994, 2008, 2009, 2017,2023
  (x2) 2004, 2016

 League Cup: 
  (x4) 2007, 2009, 2011, 2015
  (x1) 2010

 Match of Champions: 
  (x4) 2008, 2009, 2010, 2017
  (x1) 2007

References

External links
 Official website 

Ice hockey teams in France
Sport in Grenoble
Ice hockey clubs established in 1963
1963 establishments in France